Sina Schielke (born 19 May 1981, in Herdecke) is a former German sprinter. Her personal bests are 11.16 seconds in the 100 metres, 22.78 in the 200 metres, and 7.19 seconds in the indoor 60 metres.

Schielke won a silver medal in the 200 m at the 2000 World Junior Championships as well as a gold with the German 4 × 100 metres relay team. She won another medal in relay when the Germans finished second at the 2002 European Athletics Championships in Munich.

External links 

  
 
 Sports-Reference profile

1981 births
Living people
People from Herdecke
Sportspeople from Arnsberg (region)
German female sprinters
German national athletics champions
Olympic athletes of Germany
Athletes (track and field) at the 2004 Summer Olympics
European Athletics Championships medalists
Olympic female sprinters